Bacuag, officially the Municipality of Bacuag (Surigaonon: Lungsod nan Bacuag), is a 5th class municipality in the province of Surigao del Norte, Philippines. According to the 2020 census, it has a population of 14,881 people.

Geography
The town of Bacuag is situated along the north-eastern coast of Mindanao, along the eastern part of the province of Surigao del Norte. It is bounded on the north-western portion by the town of Placer and on the north-eastern portion by Hinatuan Passage. On the south-western side, it is bounded by the town of Gigaquit. On the western side, it is bounded by the town of Tubod and Alegria.

Along the south-western and north-eastern portions of the municipality are 44% mountainous areas covering portions of Barangays Cambuayon, Pongtud, Dugsangon and Santo Rosario. The arability and crop suitability of these areas are limited and allowable urban development is of low density. These are best suited for pasture and forestal purposes. A large portion of plain area covers the east and north-eastern part covering portions of Poblacion, Campo, Cabugao, Pautao and parts of Dugsangon and Payapag. Approximately 26% of these 8,256 hectares is suited for intensive agriculture and high density urban development. The remaining 30% is also suited for intensive agriculture but with soil conservation and erosion control measures. Allowable urban development ranges from high to medium density.

Certain areas in the municipality are considered flooding hazard covering 13% of the total municipal area. These are located along and near river and sea banks, located in some portions of Barangays Cabugao, Campo, Payapag, Pongtud, Cambuayon and Poblacion with flood occurrences ranging from slight to moderate.

Barangays
Bacuag is politically subdivided into 9 barangays.

 Cabugao
 Cambuayon 
 Campo 
 Dugsangon 
 Pautao 
 Payapag 
 Poblacion 
 Pungtod 
 Santo Rosario

Climate

Demographics

Economy

Since Bacuag is a coastal town, fishing is the primary economic source among local residents.

References

External links
 Bacuag Profile at PhilAtlas.com
 Bacuag Profile at the DTI Cities and Municipalities Competitive Index
 Bacuag.com - Province of Surigao del Norte
 [ Philippine Standard Geographic Code]
 Philippine Census Information
 Local Governance Performance Management System

Municipalities of Surigao del Norte